Willie Julius Green (born July 28, 1981) is an American professional basketball coach and former player who is the head coach of the New Orleans Pelicans of the National Basketball Association (NBA). He played professionally in the NBA with the Philadelphia 76ers, New Orleans Hornets, Atlanta Hawks, Los Angeles Clippers and Orlando Magic. He was selected in the second round (41st pick overall) of the 2003 NBA draft by the Seattle SuperSonics and later acquired by the Philadelphia 76ers from Seattle in a draft-night trade for the draft rights to Paccelis Morlende (50th pick overall) and cash considerations.

Professional career

Philadelphia 76ers (2003–2010)
Green was a 1999 graduate of Cooley High School; after a college career at the University of Detroit Mercy, he was selected by the Seattle SuperSonics in the second round (41st overall) of the 2003 NBA draft. He was traded the same day to the Philadelphia 76ers for the draft rights to Paccelis Morlende and cash considerations.

Green was due to re-sign with the Sixers during the 2005 offseason, but suffered an injury the day of the contract signing, which put the contract in a state of limbo. On March 23, 2006, he officially re-signed with the Sixers, and on April 4, 2006, he was activated and played 11 minutes, scoring 9 points on 4-for-6 shooting in a loss to the Cleveland Cavaliers.

Green, in the final Sixers game of the 2006–07 season, had a career-high 37 points against the Toronto Raptors on April 4, 2007.

Green beat out Rodney Carney for the Sixers starting shooting guard position. During the 2007–08 NBA season, Green had career highs in games played (74, all of them as a starter), minutes played (26.6), field goal percentage (.436), rebounds (2.5), assists (2.0), and points (12.4).

New Orleans Hornets (2010–2011)
Green was traded to New Orleans with forward Jason Smith in exchange for forward Darius Songaila and rookie forward Craig Brackins on September 23, 2010.

Atlanta Hawks (2011–2012)
On December 22, 2011, Green signed with the Atlanta Hawks.

Los Angeles Clippers (2012–2014)
On July 30, 2012, Green was signed-and-traded to the Los Angeles Clippers for the rights to Sofoklis Schortsanitis.

On June 29, 2014, he was waived by the Clippers.

Orlando Magic (2014–2015)
On June 30, 2014, Green was claimed off waivers by the Orlando Magic.

Coaching career
On August 9, 2016, Green was hired by the Golden State Warriors coaching staff as an assistant coach. He won his first championship when the Warriors defeated the Cleveland Cavaliers in five games of the 2017 NBA Finals. Green won his second straight championship when the Warriors defeated the Cavaliers in four games of the 2018 NBA Finals.

On June 26, 2019, he was hired as an assistant coach for the Phoenix Suns.

On July 22, 2021, Green was named head coach of the New Orleans Pelicans. After starting the season 1-12, Green led the Pelicans to a 36-46 record, finishing ninth in the Western Conference and securing a spot in the NBA Play-In Tournament. The Pelicans would go on to beat the San Antonio Spurs and the Los Angeles Clippers en route to their first playoff berth since the 2017–18 season. Green and the Pelicans would ultimately fall to the Phoenix Suns, Green's former team, in six games in the First Round.

Awards
Midwestern Collegiate Conference All-Newcomer Team: 2000
Second Team All-Midwestern Collegiate Conference: 2001
Horizon League Scoring Leader: 2003
Horizon League All-Tournament Team: 2003
All-Horizon First Team: 2003
Horizon League Player of the Year: 2003
Honorable Mention All-America by AP: 2003
Portsmouth Invitational All-Tournament Team: 2003

Career statistics

Regular season

|-
| align="left" | 
| align="left" | Philadelphia
| 53 || 0 || 14.5 || .401 || .311 || .728 || 1.2 || 1.0 || .5 || .1 || 6.9
|-
| align="left" | 
| align="left" | Philadelphia
| 57 || 21 || 18.7 || .366 || .286 || .776 || 2.3 || 1.8 || .6 || .1 || 7.7
|-
| align="left" | 
| align="left" | Philadelphia
| 10 || 2 || 15.3 || .424 || .526 || .800 || 1.5 || .5 || .2 || .0 || 7.0
|-
| align="left" | 
| align="left" | Philadelphia
| 74 || 36 || 24.9 || .411 || .325 || .667 || 2.1 || 1.5 || .8 || .1 || 11.3
|-
| align="left" | 
| align="left" | Philadelphia
| 74 || 74 || 26.6 || .436 || .285 || .757 || 2.5 || 2.0 || .7 || .3 || 12.4
|-
| align="left" | 
| align="left" | Philadelphia
| 81 || 60 || 22.6 || .435 || .317 || .729 || 1.6 || 2.0 || .7 || .2 || 8.5
|-
| align="left" | 
| align="left" | Philadelphia
| 73 || 18 || 21.3 || .457 || .346 || .833 || 1.8 || 2.1 || .4 || .2 || 8.7
|-
| align="left" | 
| align="left" | New Orleans
| 77 || 13 || 21.7 || .443 || .348 || .780 || 2.1 || 1.0 || .5 || .2 || 8.7
|-
| align="left" | 
| align="left" | Atlanta
| 53 || 2 || 17.4 || .471 || .442 || .857 || 1.5 || .8 || .4 || .1 || 7.6
|-
| align="left" | 
| align="left" | L.A. Clippers
| 72 || 60 || 16.5 || .461 || .428 || .719 || 1.3 || .8 || .4 || .2 || 6.3
|-
| align="left" | 
| align="left" | L.A. Clippers
| 55 || 9 || 15.8 || .376 || .339 || .824 || 1.4 || .9 || .4 || .2 || 5.0
|-
| align="left" | 
| align="left" | Orlando
| 52 || 2 || 18.3 || .386 || .347 || .824 || 1.5 || 1.3 || .5 || .1 || 5.9
|- class="sortbottom"
| style="text-align:center;" colspan="2"| Career
| 731 || 297 || 20.2 || .425 || .346 || .765 || 1.8 || 1.4 || .5 || .1 || 8.3

Playoffs

|-
| align="left" | 2005
| align="left" | Philadelphia
| 5 || 0 || 12.6 || .444 || .222 || .900 || 1.8 || .6 || .2 || .0 || 5.4
|-
| align="left" | 2008
| align="left" | Philadelphia
| 6 || 6 || 23.7 || .431 || .200 || .643 || 1.3 || 2.0 || .8 || .7 || 9.0
|-
| align="left" | 2009
| align="left" | Philadelphia
| 6 || 6 || 24.7 || .412 || .364 || .333 || 1.0 || 1.2 || .0 || .2 || 7.8
|-
| align="left" | 2011
| align="left" | New Orleans
| 6 || 0 || 14.0 || .389 || .222 || .571 || .8 || .7 || .3 || .0 || 5.7
|-
| align="left" | 2012
| align="left" | Atlanta
| 5 || 0 || 12.6 || .462 || .250 || .000 || 1.6 || .6 || .0 || .0 || 2.6
|-
| align="left" | 2013
| align="left" | L.A. Clippers
| 3 || 0 || 6.7 || .667 || .000 || 1.000 || 1.0 || .7 || .3 || .0 || 2.0
|-
| style="text-align:left;"| 2014
| style="text-align:left;"| L.A. Clippers
| 5 || 0 || 3.8 || .200 || .250 || 1.000 || 1.4 || .2 || .6 || .0 || 1.0
|- class="sortbottom"
| style="text-align:center;" colspan="2"| Career
| 36 || 12 || 15.0 || .418 || .256 || .711 || 1.3 || .9 || .3 || .1 || 5.2

Head coaching record

|-
| style="text-align:left;"|New Orleans
| style="text-align:left;"|
| 82||36||46|||| style="text-align:center;"|3rd in Southwest||6||2||4||
| style="text-align:center;"|Lost in First Round
|- class="sortbottom"
| colspan="2" style="text-align:center;"|Career
| 82||36||46|||| ||6||2||4||||

See also

Disappearance of Toni Sharpless, 2009 missing persons case of a woman not seen since shortly after she left Green's house at the time; he was cleared of any involvement

References

External links

ESPN.com Profile

1981 births
Living people
African-American basketball players
American men's basketball coaches
American men's basketball players
Atlanta Hawks players
Basketball coaches from Michigan
Basketball players from Detroit
Cooley High School alumni
Detroit Mercy Titans men's basketball players
Golden State Warriors assistant coaches
Los Angeles Clippers players
New Orleans Hornets players
New Orleans Pelicans head coaches
Orlando Magic players
Philadelphia 76ers players
Phoenix Suns assistant coaches
Seattle SuperSonics draft picks
Shooting guards
21st-century African-American sportspeople
20th-century African-American people